Orehek pri Materiji is a small settlement in the Municipality of Hrpelje-Kozina in the Littoral region of Slovenia.

Name
The name of the settlement was changed from Orehek to Orehek pri Materiji in 1955.

References

External links
Orehek pri Materiji on Geopedia

Populated places in the Municipality of Hrpelje-Kozina